Roxon is a surname. Notable people with the surname include:

Katarina Roxon (born 1993), Canadian swimmer
Lillian Roxon (1932–1973), Australian journalist and author
Nicola Roxon (born 1967), Australian politician